The following article presents a summary of the 2020–21 football season in Croatia, which is the 30th season of competitive football in the country.

National teams

Croatia

Croatia U21

Croatia U19

Croatia U17

Croatia Women's

Croatia Women's U19

Croatia Women's U17

League tables

Croatian First Football League

Croatian Second Football League

Croatian clubs in Europe

Summary

Dinamo Zagreb

Lokomotiva

Rijeka

Osijek

Hajduk Split

ŽNK Split

Dinamo Zagreb U19

References